Bill Cocks (15 December 1936 – 17 August 2011) was an  Australian rules footballer who played with Hawthorn in the Victorian Football League (VFL).

Notes

External links 

1936 births
2011 deaths
Australian rules footballers from Western Australia
Hawthorn Football Club players
Swan Districts Football Club players